Hartry H. Field (born November 30, 1946) is an American philosopher. He is Silver Professor of Philosophy at New York University; he is a notable contributor to philosophy of science, philosophy of mathematics, epistemology, and philosophy of mind.

Field is also Distinguished Research Professor in the Department of Philosophy, University of Birmingham, UK.

Education and career
Field earned a B.A. in mathematics from the University of Wisconsin in 1967 and an M.A. in philosophy from Harvard University in 1968.  He earned his Ph.D. in philosophy from Harvard in 1972 under the direction of Hilary Putnam.  He taught first at Princeton University, and then at the University of Southern California and City University of New York Graduate Center before joining the NYU faculty.

Field was elected Fellow of the American Academy of Arts and Sciences in 2003 and is also a past winner of the Lakatos Prize in 1986.

Philosophical work
Field's first work was a commentary on Alfred Tarski's theory of truth, which he has worked on since 1972.  His current view on this matter is in favor of a deflationary theory of truth. His most influential work produced in this period is probably "Theory Change and the Indeterminacy of Reference" (Journal of Philosophy, 70(14): 462–481), in which he introduced the concept of partial denotation.

In the 1980s, Field started a project in the philosophy of mathematics discussing mathematical fictionalism, the doctrine that all mathematical statements are merely useful fictions, and should not be taken to be literally true.  More precisely, Field holds that the existence of  sets may be denied, in opposition to the Quine–Putnam indispensability argument.

Much of his current work is in semantic paradoxes. In 2008, he gave the John Locke Lectures, entitled "Logic, Normativity, and Rational Revisability."

Books
Science Without Numbers, Blackwell, 1980
Realism, Mathematics and Modality, Blackwell, 1989
Truth and the Absence of Fact, Oxford University Press 2001
Saving Truth from Paradox, Oxford University Press, 2008

See also
American philosophy
List of American philosophers
New York University Department of Philosophy

References

External links
Field, Hartry – New York University

1946 births
Living people
Harvard Graduate School of Arts and Sciences alumni
21st-century American philosophers
Philosophers of mathematics
New York University faculty
Analytic philosophers
Philosophers of language
Philosophers of mind
Lakatos Award winners